Claudea elegans is a marine red alga species in the genus Claudea. It occurs in tropical waters in Australia, India, Pakistan and Brazil and may reach 40 centimeters in length.

References

External links

 Algaebase: Claudea elegans

Delesseriaceae
Species described in 1813